The Oulad Bou Sbaa (var. Oulad Bou Sbaâ, Oulad Bousbae, from awlād abū sib'a, children of Abu Sib'a, the "Father of the Lions") is a Chorfa/Zaouia tribe, who claim descent from Abu Sib'a, the Idrissid 16th century tribal chief. They live in Morocco, Western Sahara and Mauritania, with members of the tribe holding different nationalities depending on their residence and upbringing. In the 19th and 20th century, the tribe's influence in its core areas of southern Spanish Sahara was diminished and permanently weakened following defeat in bloody battles against the Reguibat tribal confederations, which were then rapidly asserting their influence over these areas. Speakers of Hassaniya Arabic, they were nomadic (Bedouin), and herded camels in today's Western Sahara and Mauritania. 

The Oulad Bou Sbaa is reputed to have been the first tribe to have brought tea to the region and the green Sahrawi tea is now part of the national heritage.

Several Oulad Bou Sbaa members played a prominent role in the military and security establishment of Mauritanian President Maaouya Ould Sid'Ahmed Taya (1984–2005) in Mauritania, and have remained influential after his downfall: e.g. the coup-leaders of 2005 and 2008, Gen. Mohamed Ould Abdel Aziz, and Col. Ely Ould Mohamed Vall.

Family tree : 

Oulad âmer ben abu sbâa: 

Oulâd El-Ghazi :  Oulad abd el-moula. Oulad Chennan. 

Oulad Djemmouna. El-Ababsa. El-Helalat. El-Gouaîat.

Oulad El-Haj : Oulad Beg-gar. Oulad bou anga. Oulad Aïssa. Oulad zaouia. Lkhlalta.

Oulad brahim :  Abidat. Dmissat. Oulad Moumen. Oulad Sghiri. Mdadha. Mzazka. Oulad Azouz. Nebobat. Oulad Akrim. Ahel Taleb boubker. Oulad El-Haj. Oulad Ahmeda. El-metlota. Lmâachat.

Oulad amer :  << Touijrat >>. Anfliss. Oulad sidi abd-ellah. Oulad sidi abd-el Malek. Oulad sidi Mbaerk ben Mellok.

Oula Amran ben abu sbâa : 

Bouhssin :  Oulad Sidi abd-el ouhab. Oulad abd-ellah ben mbarek. Ahel Tmaloult. Bharir.

Makhlouf :  oulad sôula. Rehahla. Lhmaïdat

Said :  Sâidat. El ouâmer. Oulad el-Zir 

Idriss : Oulad Sidi boûtlili. El-Asasla. El-Drabka. Ahl- boudrbila. Oulad Idriss.

See also
Djema'a
Sahrawi
Moors

References
Mohamad Z. Yakan. Almanac of African peoples & nations (p. 610)
Anthony G. Pazzanita. Historical Dictionary of Western Sahara (Third Edition) Historical Dictionaries of Africa, No. 96 The Scarecrow Press, (2006)
Virtual Museum of Canada: Oulad Bou Sbaâ carpets

Bedouin groups
History of Mauritania
Sahrawi tribes